Zafarul Islam Islahi  (born 1950), is Professor and Chairman of Department of Islamic Studies at Aligarh Muslim University, Aligarh India and a member of Management Committee of Darul Musannefin Shibli Academy, Azamgarh India. He is also Secretary of Idarah Ulumul Quran, Aligarh India and a Historian, Islamic, Quarnic scholar.

Islahi, born in 1950, belonged to Chitteypur (Azamgarh, U.P.). He obtained the degree of Al-Fazilat from Madrasatul Islah (Sarai Mir, Azamgarh), and completed Fazil-i-Adab and B.A. from Lucknow University (Lucknow). He did his M.A., M.Phil. & PhD in history from Aligarh Muslim University, Aligarh. For M.Phil. and PhD, he worked on Agrarian Law of the Mughal Empire and Concept of State and Law in the Mughal Empire respectively. For about five years (1980–1984), he worked as Research Associate in the Department of History (A.M.U., Aligarh). He joined the Department of Islamic Studies (A.M.U., Aligarh) as lecturer on 31 October 1984. Presently, he is Professor & Chairman in the same department.

Bibliography
1. Socio – Economic Dimension of Fiqh Literature in Medieval India, Research Cell, Dayal Singh Trust Library, Lahore, 1990.

2. Kitabiyat-i-Farahi, Idarah Ulum al-Quran, Aligarh, 1991

3. Islami Qawanin ki Tarwij wa Tanfiz Ahd – i – Firuzshahi ke Hindustan mein, Idara Ulum-i-Islamia, A.M.U., Aligarh, 1998

4. Sir Sayed wa M.A.O. College aur Dini wa Mashriqi Ulum, Islamic Book Foundation, New Delhi, 2001

5. Salatin- i-Dehli aur Shariat-i-Islamiah – Yek Mukhtasar Jaizah, Aligarh, 2002

6. Quran aur Science (Seminar Maqalat), (Co-Editor), Institute of Islamic Studies, A.M.U., Aligarh 2003

7. Fatawa Literature of the Sultanate Period, Kanishka Publishers, New Delhi, 2005

8. Contribution of Shaikh Ahmad Sirhindi to Islamic Thought (Seminar Papers) (Co-Editor),Institute of Islamic Studies, A.M.U. Aligarh, 2005

9. Ishariah Shashmahi Ulum al-Quran, Idarah Ulum al-Quran, Aligarh, 2005

10. Talim Ahd-i-Islami ke Hindustan mein, Darul Musannefin, Shibli Academy, Azamgarh, 2007

11. Quran Majeed ka Maqam-wa-Martabah aur us ke Taqaze, Halqah-i-Dars-i-Quran, Aligarh, 2007

12. Role of Muslims in the Freedom Movement of India (Seminar Papers) (Co-Editor), Institute of Islamic Studies, A.M.U. Aligarh, 2007

13. Qurani Afkar wa Talimat aur Maujudah daur mein un ki Manawiyyat, Universal Book House, Aligarh, 2008

14. Mutalaat -i- Sir Sayyed –Talimi,Samaji aur Fiqhi Masail ke Hawale se, Institute of Islamic Studies,A.M.U. Aligarh, 2008

Academic staff of Aligarh Muslim University
21st-century Muslim scholars of Islam
21st-century Indian Muslims
Living people
1950 births